Ubong King (22 August 1972 – 26 December 2020) was a Nigerian business consultant, security expert and motivational speaker. King was the president of the Ubong King Foundation, a non-profit, non-governmental organisation targeted at training young people towards leadership.
He was also the convener of a youth empowerment conference in Africa, Thinkation. Prior to his foray into full-time youth development and mentorship, Ubong King worked as the Chief Executive Officer, Protection Plus Securities Limited.

He was a frequent speaker at various seminars, conferences and workshops in Nigeria and across Africa as a result of his passion for youth development and the economic liberation of Africa as a continent.

Early life and education 
Ubong King was born in Lagos State. He obtained his Senior Secondary School Certificate from the Federal Government College, Ijanikin, Lagos. King then proceeded to the University of Calabar, where he studied Agriculture Education.

Career 
Ubong King began his career as a volunteer guard in the protocol department of the church he was attending at the time. King also worked as a consultant in a piggery, before venturing into the security industry. King went on to start Protection Plus Security Limited.

King facilitated and spoke at leadership and management retreats within and outside Nigeria.

In 2018, the Ubong King Foundation convened the maiden edition of 'Thinkation'- a platform to encourage productivity among the youth demography in Nigeria.

He was a recipient of the 2016 African Child Prize for ‘Integrity Security Intelligence’ by the African Child Foundation and one of the few recipients of the Star Award in Maritime Security by Crime reporters Association of Nigeria (CRAN). He was a former Chairman of the American Society of Industrial Security (ASIS), Lagos Chapter.

He had several certifications and was an alumnus of the prestigious Lagos Business School where he graduated from the Executive Management Program (MSMP 47) and was elected class president and a serving member of the Governing Council of the school. He also attended the Brazilian business experience course in Brazil and an Executive Master’s Program in Business Administration from the Metropolitan School of Business and Management. He was a Fellow of the Institute for Government, Research, Leadership, technology where he was schooled in Corporate Conference and Strategic Management. He was a member of the Nigeria-German Business Association. He actively participated in the Poland-Africa Business forum.
 He was a former chairman of The American Society of Industrial Security (ASIS) International Chapter 206, Lagos Nigeria.

Personal life  
King was reported dead in the early hours of 26 December 2020, after testing positive for COVID-19.

References

External links

Nigerian motivational speakers
1972 births
2020 deaths
Businesspeople from Lagos
University of Calabar alumni
Deaths from the COVID-19 pandemic in Nigeria